Dave Holland (born c.1955) is the founder and Grand Dragon of the Southern White Knights of the Ku Klux Klan.

He was among those ordered to pay restitution for organizing a demonstration that became a violent attack against  a civil rights march on January 17, 1987. The Supreme Court upheld the decision.

References

External links
U.S. Dept of Justice Article

Ku Klux Klan Grand Dragons
Living people
Place of birth missing (living people)
Year of birth uncertain